Lexell is a lunar impact crater that lies across the southeastern rim of the huge walled plain Deslandres, in the southern part of the Moon. It was named after Swedish-Russian mathematician and astronomer Anders Johan Lexell. To the northeast is the walled plain Walther, and to the south is Orontius, another walled plain.

This is a somewhat irregular formation with a wide break in the northern rim. The western rim forms a low, arcing wall, and is overlain to the southwest by Lexell H after passing the rim of Deslandres. The rim peaks along the southeast, then comes to an end at a rugged promontory-like ridge. The interior floor has been resurfaced by lava to the northwest and in sections of the remainder of the floor. There are some low rises and ghost-crater rims in the southeast half part of the interior floor.

Satellite craters
By convention these features are identified on lunar maps by placing the letter on the side of the crater midpoint that is closest to Lexell.

References

External links

 

Impact craters on the Moon